In mathematics, the Leray–Schauder degree is an extension of the degree of a base point preserving continuous map between spheres  or equivalently to a boundary sphere preserving continuous maps between balls  to boundary sphere preserving maps between balls in a Banach space , assuming that the map is of the form  where  is the identity map and  is some compact map (i.e. mapping bounded sets to sets whose closure is compact).

The degree was invented by Jean Leray and Juliusz Schauder to prove existence results for partial differential equations.

References

Topology